, or simply Ōji Stadium, is an athletic stadium in Kobe, Hyōgo, Japan.

It hosted the 1963 Emperor's Cup. The final game between Waseda University and Hitachi was played there on January 15, 1964.

Sports venues in Hyōgo Prefecture
Sport in Kobe
Football venues in Japan
Sports venues completed in 1951
1951 establishments in Japan
Buildings and structures in Kobe
Tourist attractions in Kobe